The women's field hockey tournament at the 2014 South American Games was the 2nd edition of the field hockey event for women at the South American Games. It was held over an eight-day period beginning on 9 March, and culminating with the medal finals on 16 March. All games were played at the Prince of Wales Country Club in Santiago, Chile.

Argentina won the tournament for the second time after defeating Chile 3–1 in the final. Uruguay finished in third place, defeating Brazil 3–0.

The tournament served as a qualifier for the 2015 Pan American Games in Toronto, Canada.

Teams
Including the host nation, who received an automatic berth, six teams participated in the tournament.

Results
All times are local (ART).

Preliminary round

Fixtures

Classification round

Fifth place match

Bronze medal match

Gold medal match

Statistics

Final standings

Goalscorers

References

External links
Pan American Hockey Federation

2014 South American Games events
South American Games
2014
2014 South American Games
Qualification tournaments for the 2015 Pan American Games